The Nashville Predators are an American professional ice hockey team based in Nashville, Tennessee. They play in the Central Division of the Western Conference in the National Hockey League (NHL). The team joined the NHL in 1998 as an expansion team. The Predators have played their home games at the Bridgestone Arena since their inaugural season. The Predators are owned by Predators Holdings LLC, David Poile is their general manager.

Until the end of the 2013–14 season, the Predators franchise had only had one head coach, Barry Trotz. Trotz was then replaced by Peter Laviolette on May 6, 2014. Laviolette helped the Predators capture their first Clarence S. Campbell Bowl as well as making the team's first Stanley Cup Final appearance. The current head coach John Hynes replaced Laviolette during the 2019–20 season.

Key

Coaches
Note: Statistics are correct through Laviolette's firing in the 2019–20 season.

Notes

References

Bibliography
 

Nashville Predators coaches
Nashville Predators head coaches
Head coaches